Woodlawn Cemetery is a rural cemetery and arboretum located in Toledo, Ohio. It is one of several cemeteries in the United States to have that name, and one of a few to be on the National Register of Historic Places.

Notable interments
 Christian Albert (1842–1922), Medal of Honor recipient
 Horace Newton Allen (1858–1932), missionary, physician, and American ambassador to Korea
 James Mitchell Ashley (1824–1896), Member of the United States House of Representatives
 Lud Ashley (1923–2010), Member of the United States House of Representatives
 Walter Folger Brown (1869–1961) 49th Postmaster General
 Lave Cross (1866–1927), Baseball player
 Charles Doolittle (1832–1903), Civil War general
 John H. Doyle (1844–1919), Associate Justice of the Ohio Supreme Court
 John W. Fuller (1827–1891), Civil War brevet major general
 Steve Gordon (1938–1982), screenwriter and film director
 William T. Jackson (1876–1933), mayor of Toledo from 1928–31
 Samuel M. Jones (1846−1904), Progressive Era mayor of Toledo
 Addie Joss (1880–1911), Baseball Hall Of Fame pitcher
 David Ross Locke (1833–1888), Civil War journalist and commentator
 Frazier Reams (1897−1971), U.S. Representative
 Isaac R. Sherwood (1835–1925), Member of the United States House of Representatives
 James B. Steedman (1817–1883), Union Army Civil War General
 David L. Stine (1857–1941), architect
 Myles Thomas (1897–1963), MLB pitcher
 John Tiedtke (1907–2004), philanthropist, farmer, and scion of the founder of Tiedtke's
 Morrison Waite (1816–1888), 7th Chief Justice of the United States

References

External links
 

Cemeteries in Lucas County, Ohio
Historic districts on the National Register of Historic Places in Ohio
Protected areas of Lucas County, Ohio
National Register of Historic Places in Lucas County, Ohio
Cemeteries on the National Register of Historic Places in Ohio
Geography of Toledo, Ohio
Tourist attractions in Toledo, Ohio
1876 establishments in Ohio
Rural cemeteries